Quebec Senior Football League operated in the 1950s and 1960s and ceased operations after the 1966 season. It was a league for players that were both junior and a bit older than juniors, and included the Verdun Shamcats and the Chateauguay Ramblers. It was followed by the strictly junior Quebec Juvenile Football League.

References 

Defunct Canadian football leagues
Canadian football leagues in Quebec